Grant Martin Overton (September 19, 1887July 4, 1930) was an American writer and critic.

Grant Martin Overton was born on September 19, 1887, in Patchogue, New York, to Ardelia Jarvis (Skidmore) and Floyd Alward Overton. He attended Princeton University from 1904 to 1906. He was a fiction editor at Collier's from 1924 to 1930. Overton died on July 4, 1930, in Patchogue.

Publications 
 Mermaid (1920)
 The Answerer (1921)
 World Without End (1921)
 Island of the Innocent (1923)
 The Thousand and First Night (1924)

References 

1887 births
1930 deaths
20th-century American male writers
American literary critics
People from Patchogue, New York
Princeton University alumni